Pyropyga modesta is a species of firefly in the beetle family Lampyridae. It is found in Central America and North America.

References

Further reading

 
 

Lampyridae
Bioluminescent insects
Articles created by Qbugbot
Beetles described in 1961